Tommy Ho and Mark Philippoussis were the defending champions but did not compete that year.

Patrick Galbraith and Andrei Olhovskiy won in the final 6–3, 6–7, 7–6 against Kent Kinnear and Dave Randall.

Seeds
Champion seeds are indicated in bold text while text in italics indicates the round in which those seeds were eliminated.

 Todd Woodbridge /  Mark Woodforde (quarterfinals)
 Patrick Galbraith /  Andrei Olhovskiy (champions)
 Rick Leach /  Scott Melville (first round)
 Martin Damm /  Peter Nyborg (semifinals)

Draw

References
 1996 Salem Open Doubles Draw

Hong Kong Open (tennis)
Doubles